Typhoon Phanfone, known in the Philippines as Typhoon Ursula, was a strong and deadly tropical cyclone which traversed the Philippines on Christmas Eve and Christmas Day in 2019, the first typhoon to do so since Nock-ten in 2016.

The twenty-ninth and final named storm of the 2019 Pacific typhoon season, the origins of Phanfone can be traced to an upper-level low which had formed near the Caroline Islands and gradually organized into a tropical depression on December 19. Moving generally west-northwestward, the system intensified into a tropical storm on December 22 and moved into the Philippine Area of Responsibility (PAR) on the following day as it continued gaining strength. Phanfone intensified to typhoon status shortly before making its first landfall over the Eastern Visayas region on Christmas Eve. Phanfone maintained its typhoon strength for several hours as it exited the Philippines landmass before unfavorable conditions caused it to rapidly deteriorate and dissipate over the South China Sea.

Phanfone crossed the central Philippines after the stronger Kammuri struck nearly the same region merely weeks prior, with a track fairly similar to 2013’s Haiyan. The system caused destruction in the regions of Eastern Visayas, Western Visayas, and Mimaropa.

Meteorological history

Prior to its formation on December 19, the Joint Typhoon Warning Center (JTWC) began monitoring a low pressure system to the southeast of Micronesia. Showing signs of convection and sufficient banding around a defined center, the JTWC subsequently upgraded its initial warning to a medium chance of development. Shortly thereafter on December 20, JTWC issued a tropical cyclone formation alert, while the Japan Meteorological Agency (JMA) issued its first advisory on the system. By December 22, the system gained tropical storm strength and JMA issued the named Phanfone.
Moving generally west-northwestward, Phanfone moved into the Philippine Area of Responsibility (PAR) at 5:00 am PHT December 23 and the Philippine weather bureau PAGASA locally named the system as Ursula. Owing to favorable conditions, Phanfone intensified further into a severe tropical storm hours later. By afternoon of December 24, Phanfone gained typhoon strength shortly before making its first three landfalls over Salcedo, Eastern Samar (4:45 pm PHT), Tacloban City (7:30 pm PHT), and Cabucgayan, Biliran (9:15 pm PHT). Further intensification ensued until December 25, with Phanfone peaking at 00:00 UTC with  10-minute sustained winds and a central pressure dropping to 970 hPa; the JTWC reported that Phanfone peaked at nute sustained winds, equivalent to a Category 2 typhoon. Phanfone continued its west-northwestward track and, by afternoon of the same day, PAGASA had reported four additional landfalls: Gigantes Islands (2:30 am PHT), Ibajay, Aklan (8:40 am PHT), Semirara Island (1:00 pm PHT), and Bulalacao, Oriental Mindoro (3:00 pm PHT).

By December 26, Phanfone had already exited the Philippine landmass, moving northwest over the South China Sea. After holding strength for several hours, the system began losing strength due to unfavorable sea surface temperatures, medium wind shear and dry air intrusion. On December 27, Phanfone dropped to tropical storm status while rapidly deteriorating and slowly moving. On December 28, PAGASA issued its final warning as the system exited the PAR; later, JMA issued their final advisories as Phanfone weakened below warning threshold.

Preparations and impact

Visayas
The PAGASA issued a signal 3 warning to Northern Samar, Samar, Eastern Samar, Leyte, Biliran and the Camotes Islands, meaning that  winds were expected. The PAGASA also issued a signal 2 warning to the Visayas, meaning that  winds were to be expected within 24 hours. It was issued to the central portion of northern Cebu, northeastern Iloilo, northern Antique, Capiz, Aklan, Southern Leyte, and Negros Occidental, which meant that Phanfone was taking a similar path to the areas hit by the much stronger Typhoon Haiyan. The Visayas was the worst hit, with Iloilo City having 13 casualties alone that had been either struck by fallen trees, electrocuted or drowned. Roxas, Tacloban and Maasin all received  of rain. The extent of damage in the Philippines was quite far, with the Boracay Airport being heavily damaged as many people were stranded in the airport as the typhoon struck. A disaster response officer also reported that power outages and damage in the town of Batad in Iloilo Province made it appear as a “ghost town”. Severe flooding caused devastating damage in the many provinces and islands of Visayas as rain spread across the region, with many houses and vehicles being partially to completely submerged. Multiple houses were crumpled and trees were downed, as well as power lines being downed. All of these obstacles blocked off roads and made roads dangerous to walk on; and the excessive amounts of rainfall made ground, especially higher ground, very unstable. The province of Leyte was placed under a state of calamity following the damage of the typhoon, with livestock, crops and infrastructure being damaged in excess of $1 million USD. Most of the casualties are estimated to have taken place at Iloilo, as the village was badly hit with severe and swift-moving flash floods. Tacloban was hit as fires broke out and winds allowed them to spread but it the 220,000 inhabitants escaped the worst of the system. 147 cities were affected by power outages but by Friday, December 27, 31 of those 147 had their power restored.

Eastern Samar
Because of the upcoming Christmas celebrations, 16,000 passengers who had holiday plans in their respective provinces with their families, were stranded in port for their safety due to the threat of the typhoon. Upon making landfall near Salcedo in Eastern Samar around 4:45 PM, it was reported that the typhoon was causing major flooding and mudslides in the region. As the storm quickly and unexpectedly intensified, over 58,000 people were evacuated in advance of the typhoon. Five fishermen were reported missing and a 70-year-old man died after his house was swept away and as a result, he drowned. Around 2,351 people have been affected by the typhoon and 1,654 were taking refuge in evacuation centers. The World Food Programme issued advisories and infographics plotting the projected path of Phanfone, as well as evacuation and relief centers. As of December 27, 2019, there are at least 28 confirmed fatalities according to the Philippines Disaster Agency, including a 13-year-old boy who was electrocuted.

Luzon
A signal 2 warning was also issued to Luzon, with the southern portion of Quezon, Marinduque, Oriental Mindoro, Occidental Mindoro including Lubang Island, Romblon, Albay, Sorsogon, Burias Island, Calamian and Cuyo Islands all forecast to be in the path of Phanfone. A signal 1 warning was issued to Bulacan, Bataan, Metro Manila, Rizal, rest of Quezon, Laguna, Batangas, Camarines Sur, Camarines Norte, Catanduanes and northern Palawan. The island's governor ordered local government units to conduct a forced evacuation plan, prompting civilians near flood-prone areas and areas with the potential to be affected by landslides, to relocate temporarily as a safety precaution. Local representatives visited residents in Libon, Maninila and Tandarora to advise them to evacuate and temporarily celebrate Christmas in evacuation centers for their safety. Many public schools were open in order to serve as shelters for residents while the provincial government distributed food packs to the evacuees. In Naval, the local government unit deployed evacuation tents for evacuees on Monday, December 23 with some tents reserved for senior citizens, pregnant women and people with disabilities. Personnel of the Romblon Provincial Mobile Force Company were deployed and conducted an inventory of Search and Rescue (SAR) equipment on December 23 in preparation for the typhoon. San Jose experienced  of rain in just under 24 hours. Upwards of 58,000 people were evacuated from Luzon and its surrounding islands as the system brought torrential rain and severe flash flooding ensued as a result of the rains. One family was swept away whilst trying to reach higher ground. Water and power services were completely cut off, and restoration was estimated to take weeks.

Retirement
Due to extensive damage done by Typhoon Phanfone in the Philippines, PAGASA announced that the name Ursula will be removed from the list of typhoon names, with the agency choosing Ugong as its replacement name. The name Phanfone was also retired during the 52nd annual session of the ESCAP/WMO Typhoon Committee in February 2020, and was eventually replaced by Nokaen in February 2021.

See also

 Weather of 2019
 Tropical cyclones in 2019
 Typhoon Haiyan (2013) – an extremely powerful typhoon which devastated the same area six years before
 Typhoon Hagupit (2014) – made landfall in the same area at a similar intensity
 Typhoon Nock-ten (2016) – Another typhoon that impacted the Philippines on Christmas Eve and Christmas Day
 Typhoon Kammuri (2019) – struck a similar area only weeks before and took a similar track
 Typhoon Vongfong (2020) – A strong category 3 typhoon impacted The Philippines after 6 months of inactivity in 2020.
 Typhoon Rai (2021) – Another typhoon that impacted the Philippines one week before Christmas Eve.

References

Phanfone
Typhoon Phanfone
Tropical cyclones in 2019
Typhoon Phanfone
Typhoons in the Philippines